Albert Shin is a Canadian filmmaker, best known for his critically acclaimed Canadian Screen Award-nominated films In Her Place (2014) and Disappearance at Clifton Hill (2019). He works frequently with collaborator Igor Drljaca.

Early life 
Shin was born in Canada and raised in Newmarket, Ontario. His parents are of South Korean descent. Shin later studied film production at York University, where he created several short films.

Career 
Before making the leap into features, Shin directed the short film Kai's Place, and the short-run television series In Counseling.

His feature directorial debut, Point Traverse, was released in 2009. The microbudget film screened at several film festivals, including the Wisconsin Film Festival.

In Her Place 
His second feature film was released in 2014; it was acclaimed by critics and screened at festivals around the world. For his work on In Her Place, Shin won several awards, and garnered several Canadian Screen Award nominations at the 3rd Canadian Screen Awards, including nominations in the categories of Best Director and Best Original Screenplay.

The film received positive reviews from critics upon release and holds an 80% rating on Rotten Tomatoes. Jay Weissberg wrote, in his Variety review, "an acutely observed psychodrama from sophomore helmer Albert Shin, powered by three sterling performances." NOW Magazine called it "an expertly plotted drama that packs a paralyzing emotional gut punch." The Globe and Mail praised it as "thematically ambitious, and blunt in its portrayal of the bloody-minded demands of domestic bliss."

Disappearance at Clifton Hill 
Five years later, Shin co-wrote and directed the 2019 thriller Disappearance at Clifton Hill, starring Tuppence Middleton, Hannah Gross, Marie-Josée Croze, Eric Johnson and the Canadian filmmaker David Cronenberg. The film, originally titled Clifton Hill, was partially inspired by the motel Shin's parents owned in Niagara Falls, Ontario. It premiered at the 2019 Toronto International Film Festival and was released theatrically in the U.S. and Canada on February 28, 2020.

Timelapse Pictures 
Shin founded the Toronto-based production company Timelapse Pictures with producing partner Igor Drljaca.

Filmography 

Shin has also edited his first two features, as well as Drljaca's Krivina (2012) and Jessup's Boy (2015).

Awards

References

External links 

21st-century Canadian screenwriters
Film directors from Ontario
Film producers from Ontario
Canadian writers of Asian descent
Canadian people of South Korean descent
People from Newmarket, Ontario
York University alumni
Living people
Year of birth missing (living people)
Asian-Canadian filmmakers
21st-century Canadian male writers
Canadian male screenwriters
Canadian film production company founders